Since the establishment of sovereignty with the ratification of the constitution in 1993, Andorra has moved to become an active member of the international community. In July 1993, Andorra established its first diplomatic mission in the world to the United Nations.

Foreign affairs are supervised by the Ministry of External Affairs (Catalan: Ministeri d'Afers Exteriors).

Memberships
Andorra is a full member of the United Nations (UN), United Nations Educational, Scientific and Cultural Organization (UNESCO), United Nations Conference on Trade and Development (UNCTAD), International Criminal Court (ICC), International Centre for the Study of the Preservation and Restoration of Cultural Property (ICCROM), International Telecommunication Union (ITU), International Red Cross, Universal Copyright Convention, Council of Europe, World Tourism Organization, Organization for Security and Cooperation in Europe (OSCE), Customs Cooperation Council (CCC), and Interpol. Since 1991, Andorra has had a special agreement with the European Union.

Disputes - international:
none

Bilateral relations

List of countries which have diplomatic relations with Andorra:

Africa

Americas

Asia

Europe

Oceania

See also
 Andorra–France border
 Andorra–Spain border
 List of diplomatic missions in Andorra
 List of diplomatic missions of Andorra

Notes and references

Notes

References

External links
  Ministry of Foreign Affairs